Dana Protopopescu is a Romanian pianist settled in Belgium.

Protopopescu serves as the Queen Elisabeth Violin Competition's accompanist since 1989 and teaches at the Queen Elisabeth School of Music. She is also active as a chamber musician.

References
  Queen Elisabeth College of Music
  2006 Adolphe Sax International Competition
   Chapel Hill Chamber Music Workshop
  Fundación Carlos de Amberes

External links
 Performance of Gabriel Fauré's 1st violin sonata

Romanian classical pianists
Romanian women pianists
Living people
21st-century classical pianists
Year of birth missing (living people)
21st-century women pianists